Pallikondapattu is a small hamlet in the town of Tiruvannamalai. This village is around 5 km before Tiruvannamalai, off National Highway 66 (NH66) and forms part of the postal area of "Chinakangiyanur". 

This village is surrounded by big lake on one corner and farms on all other sides. The village is totally dependent on North-West Monsoon. The village is lush green during rainy days and extremely dry in summer.

There are many small temples, also there is a small Christian community. The basic occupation is farming and cattle rearing. The main crops include paddy and sugarcane. At the west end of the village on the banks of small stream the "Masi Magam" festival is celebrated once in a year during the month of February.

The Railway route is from Tindivanam to Tiruvannamalai.  S. K. P. Engineering College is on the North East corner of the village.

Reference

Cities and towns in Tiruvannamalai district